YMG may refer to:

 Young Masters Golf, a Junior Golf Programme
 Young Marble Giants, a Welsh band
 Manitouwadge Airport, IATA code YMG
 The Yngwie Malmsteen Group.  80's Hair Metal Band
 YMG agar, a microbial growth medium containing yeast, malt, and glucose